Anton Bengtsson (born May 13, 1993) is a Swedish professional ice hockey forward currently playing with Rögle BK in the Swedish Hockey League (SHL).

Playing career
Bengtsson played two seasons in the J20 SuperElit with HV71 before he made his Elitserien debut with the senior squad during the 2012–13 Elitserien season.

On 11 April 2019, Bengtsson left HV71 after seven seasons to sign as a free agent to a two-year contract with fellow SHL club, Rögle BK.

Career statistics

Regular season and playoffs

International

Awards and honours

References

External links

1993 births
Living people
HV71 players
Rögle BK players
Swedish ice hockey forwards
Sportspeople from Karlstad